Michael Ho may refer to:

 Michael Ho (surfer) (born 1957), Chinese American surfer
 Michael Ho (politician) (born 1955), member of the Legislative Council of Hong Kong
 Mike He (born 1983), or Mike Ho, Taiwanese actor 
 Michael Ho (racing driver) (born 1968), racing driver of Macau